Adila is a village in Estonia. It may also refer to:

 Adila (name), list of people with the name
 Hendrella adila, species of flies